Marcel Ramon Ponickwar de Souza, commonly known as Marcel de Souza, or simply Marcel (born December 4, 1956 in Campinas), is a retired Brazilian professional basketball player and a professional coach.

Professional career
During his pro club career, de Souza won the 1979 edition of the FIBA Intercontinental Cup, while a member of EC Sírio.

National team career
De Souza played at 5 FIBA World Cups: (1974, 1978, 1982, 1986, and 1990). He totaled 37 games played and 494 points scored during those competitions, and he won a bronze medal at the 1978 tournament. De Souza also played with Brazil at the Summer Olympic Games of 1980, 1984, 1988, and 1992.

Personal life
De Souza is the older brother of Maury de Souza, who is also a Brazilian former professional basketball player. De Souza is also the father-in-law of Brazilian professional basketball player Guilherme Giovannoni.

External links 
FIBA Profile 1
FIBA Profile 2
Profile at the official website of the Brazilian basketball federation  

1956 births
Living people
Brazilian basketball coaches
Brazilian men's basketball players
1974 FIBA World Championship players
1978 FIBA World Championship players
1982 FIBA World Championship players
1990 FIBA World Championship players
Basketball players at the 1975 Pan American Games
Basketball players at the 1979 Pan American Games
Basketball players at the 1980 Summer Olympics
Basketball players at the 1983 Pan American Games
Basketball players at the 1984 Summer Olympics
Basketball players at the 1987 Pan American Games
Basketball players at the 1988 Summer Olympics
Basketball players at the 1991 Pan American Games
Basketball players at the 1992 Summer Olympics
Clube Atlético Monte Líbano basketball players
Esporte Clube Pinheiros basketball coaches
Esporte Clube Sírio basketball players
Olympic basketball players of Brazil
Pan American Games bronze medalists for Brazil
Pan American Games medalists in basketball
Pan American Games gold medalists for Brazil
Pan American Games silver medalists for Brazil
Shooting guards
Small forwards
Sociedade Esportiva Palmeiras basketball players
Sport Club Corinthians Paulista basketball players
1986 FIBA World Championship players
Medalists at the 1979 Pan American Games
Sportspeople from Campinas